Monique Laurent (born 1960) is a French computer scientist and mathematician who is an expert in mathematical optimization. She is a researcher at the Centrum Wiskunde & Informatica in Amsterdam where she is also a member of the Management Team. Laurent also holds a part-time position as a professor of econometrics and operations research at Tilburg University.

Education and career
Laurent earned a doctorate from Paris Diderot University in 1986, under the supervision of Michel Deza.
She worked at CNRS from 1988 to 1997, when she moved to CWI. She took a second position at Tilburg in 2009.

Book
With Deza, Laurent is the author of the book Geometry of Cuts and Metrics (Algorithms and Combinatorics 15, Springer, 1997).

Awards and honors
She was an invited speaker at the International Congress of Mathematicians in 2014.
She was elected as a fellow of the Society for Industrial and Applied Mathematics in 2017, "for contributions to discrete and polynomial optimization and revealing interactions between them".
She has been a member of the Royal Netherlands Academy of Arts and Sciences since 2018.

References

External links
Home page at CWI
Google scholar profile

1960 births
Living people
French mathematicians
Dutch mathematicians
Dutch women mathematicians
Women mathematicians
French computer scientists
Dutch computer scientists
French women computer scientists
Dutch women computer scientists
Theoretical computer scientists
French operations researchers
Academic staff of Tilburg University
Fellows of the Society for Industrial and Applied Mathematics
Members of the Royal Netherlands Academy of Arts and Sciences
French women scientists
Dutch women scientists